Aphis may refer to:

 Aphis, a genus of aphid species
 Animal and Plant Health Inspection Service (APHIS), organizational unit of the USDA
 HMS Aphis (1915), Royal Navy insect class gunboat

See also
 Aphid
 AFIS (disambiguation)